This is a timeline of Icelandic history, comprising important legal and territorial changes and political events in Iceland and its predecessor states. To read about the background to these events, see history of Iceland.

Overview

9th century

10th century

11th century

12th century

13th century

14th century

15th century

16th century

17th century

18th century

19th century

20th century

21st century

See also
 Timeline of Faroese history
 Timeline of Swedish history
 Timeline of Reykjavík

References

Further reading
 
 
 
 
 
 

Years in Iceland
Icelandic
Iceland history-related lists